In Greek mythology, Philander (Ancient Greek: Φιλάνδρῳ means 'loving men') or Philandros was the son of the nymph Acacallis and Apollo, and the brother of Phylacides. Their mother mated with the god in the house of Carmanor in the city of Tarrha. According to the Elyrians, Phylacides and Philander were suckled by a goat.

Note

References 

 Pausanias, Description of Greece with an English Translation by W.H.S. Jones, Litt.D., and H.A. Ormerod, M.A., in 4 Volumes. Cambridge, MA, Harvard University Press; London, William Heinemann Ltd. 1918. . Online version at the Perseus Digital Library
 Pausanias, Graeciae Descriptio. 3 vols. Leipzig, Teubner. 1903.  Greek text available at the Perseus Digital Library.

Children of Apollo
Demigods in classical mythology
Cretan characters in Greek mythology